Roberto Villetti (24 August 1944 – 14 September 2019) was an Italian politician.

A long-time member of the Italian Socialist Party (PSI), he was vice-secretary of the Italian Socialists (SI) from 1994 to 1998. Since 1998 he is vice-secretary of the Italian Democratic Socialists (SDI).

He was deputy from 1996 to 2008; from 2006 to 2008 he was leader of the Rose in the Fist group in the Italian Chamber of Deputies.

References

1944 births
2019 deaths
Politicians from Rome
Italian Socialist Party politicians
Italian Socialists politicians
Italian Democratic Socialists politicians
Italian Socialist Party (2007) politicians
Deputies of Legislature XIV of Italy
Deputies of Legislature XV of Italy
Deputies of Legislature XIII of Italy